Sierra Cuchillo (knife mountains) or Cuchillo Negro Mountains is a range of mountains, primarily in Sierra County and some in southern Socorro County, New Mexico.  They were named for the knife-like shape of some of the peaks in the range, or for Cuchillo Negro an Apache leader in the region in the mid 19th century.

References 

Mountain ranges of New Mexico
Mountain ranges of Sierra County, New Mexico
Mountain ranges of Socorro County, New Mexico